Peter Kirkbride (born 19 December 1987 in Irvine, North Ayrshire) is a Scottish weightlifter. Kirkbride won a silver medal in weightlifting at the 2010 Commonwealth Games and was selected to represent Britain at the 2012 Summer Olympics in the men's 94 kg division, where he finished in 16th place. His placing was later increased to 9th overall, following failed retroactive doping tests.

References

1987 births
Living people
Scottish male weightlifters
Olympic weightlifters of Great Britain
Weightlifters at the 2012 Summer Olympics
Weightlifters at the 2010 Commonwealth Games
Sportspeople from Irvine, North Ayrshire
Commonwealth Games medallists in weightlifting
Commonwealth Games silver medallists for Scotland
Weightlifters at the 2014 Commonwealth Games
Medallists at the 2010 Commonwealth Games